The Economic and Financial Crimes Commission (EFCC) is a Nigerian law enforcement agency that investigates financial crimes such as advance fee fraud (419 fraud) and money laundering. The EFCC was established in 2003, partially in response to pressure from the Financial Action Task Force on Money Laundering (FATF), which named Nigeria as one of 23 countries non-cooperative in the international community's efforts to fight money laundering. The agency has its head office in Abuja, Nigeria.

Operatives of the Benin Zonal Command of the Economic and Financial Crimes Commission, EFCC, have arrested one Irabor Kennedy Osasogie for alleged fraud.

The Economic and Financial Crimes Commission, EFCC, has listed the requirements needed to successfully participate in the auction of properties across the country which are subject of Final Forfeiture Orders.

History

Under the previous EFCC chairman Nuhu Ribadu, the agency has addressed financial corruption by prosecuting and convicting a number of high-profile corrupt individuals, ranging from Nigeria's former chief law enforcement officer to several bank chief executives. By 2005, the EFCC arrested government officials including, Diepreye Alamieyeseigha.

In September 2006, the EFCC had 31 of Nigeria's 36 state governors under investigation for corruption. In December 2007, the Nigerian Federal Government, after extensive investigations by EFCC and other organisations, cleared the Vaswani brothers of any wrongdoing and invited them back into the country. Leading Nigerian daily "This Day" and other major newspapers reported the facts of their clearance quoting text from FG issued directives. In April 2008, the EFCC began an investigation of the very influential daughter of a former Nigerian President, Senator Iyabo Obasanjo-Bello for receiving N10 million ($100,000), stolen from the Ministry of Health. The former Health Minister (Professor Adenike Grange) and her deputy were tried for stealing over N30,000,000 ($300,000) from the ministry's unspent funds from a year before.

On June 6, 2008, Chief (Mrs) Farida Mzamber Waziri was sworn in as the new chairperson of the EFCC. Then on the 6th of August 2008, the former chairman Nuhu Ribadu was demoted from Assistant Inspector General (AIG) to Deputy Commissioner of Police (DCP).

On September 14, 2010, the head of the Forensic Unit of the EFCC, Abdullahi Muazu, was assassinated in Kaduna. He had been actively involved in the trials of several heads of banks.

Waziri was dismissed by President Goodluck Jonathan on 23 November 2011 and replaced by Ibrahim Lamorde as Acting Chairman, who was confirmed on the 15 February 2012 by the Nigerian Senate.

Ibrahim Lamorde was sacked by President Muhammadu Buhari on November 9, 2015, and replaced with Ibrahim Magu. The Nigerian Senate refused to confirm Magu as chairman of the agency twice due to security reports by law enforcement agencies in the country.

On July 6, 2020, Magu was arrested by operatives of the Department of State Services and the Nigeria Police Force and driven to the Presidential Villa where he was made to answer questions on alleged corruption against him. He was detained overnight and on July 7 was suspended from his position as chairman of the agency pending the completion of the investigation.

On July 10, 2020, President Muhammadu Buhari approved the immediate suspension of Ibrahim Magu as acting chairman of the Economic and Financial Crimes Commission (EFCC) in a statement issued by the Office of the  Attorney-General of the Federation, Abubakar Malami. President Muhammadu Buhari also approved that the EFCC Director of Operations, Mohammed Umar Abba, should take charge and oversee the activities of the Commission pending the conclusion of the ongoing investigation and further directives. On 16 February 2021 Abdulrasheed Bawa was nominated as substantive chairman of EFCC by President Muhammad Buhari.

References

Corruption on Trial?

External links 

 EFCC Official website
 EFCC Alternative Job Portal

Press
 Nigeria’s struggle with corruption, presented by the chairman of the EFCC to the US Congressional House Committee on International Development
 Banks take a breath of fresh air as FATF gives clean bill of health
 Nigeria: EFCC intensifies probe of health ministry, ThisDay newspaper, March 2008

Law enforcement in Nigeria
Government agencies established in 2003
2003 establishments in Nigeria